Conor Phillips (born 7 September 1999) is an Irish rugby union player who is currently a member of Munster's academy. He plays as a wing and represents his boyhood Limerick club Young Munster in the amateur All-Ireland League.

Early life
Phillips was born in Limerick, and attended Crescent College.

Young Munster and academy
Phillips represented his native province of Munster at various underage levels, including under-18, under-19 and under-20. He was part of the Young Munster team that defeated Garryowen 11–8 to win the 2021–22 Munster Senior Cup in March 2022.

Munster
After a series of strong performances for Munster's A team, including in the Celtic Cup, Phillips was rewarded with a place in Munster's academy in January 2021. Phillips made his senior competitive debut for Munster in their 2022–23 United Rugby Championship round three fixture against Italian club Zebre Parma on 1 October 2022.

Ireland
Having previously represented Ireland at under-18 and under-19 level, Phillips was selected in the under-20s squad for the 2019 Six Nations Under 20s Championship. He started in the 35–27 win against England and the 24–5 win against Scotland, as Ireland secured their first grand slam in the tournament since 2007. Phillips missed the 2019 World Rugby Under 20 Championship in Argentina due to injury.

Phillips received his first call up to the Ireland 7s team ahead of the International Rugby 7's tournament at St George's Park, England in May 2021, where they played hosts Great Britain and the United States. He was also selected for the 2021 World Rugby Sevens Series.

Honours

Young Munster
Munster Senior Cup:
Winner (1): 2021–22

Ireland under-20s
Six Nations Under 20s Championship:
Winner (1): 2019
Grand Slam:
Winner (1): 2019
 Triple Crown:
 Winner (1): 2019

References

External links
Munster A Profile

1999 births
Living people
People educated at Crescent College
Rugby union players from Limerick (city)
Irish rugby union players
Young Munster players
Munster Rugby players
Ireland international rugby sevens players
Black Irish sportspeople
Rugby union wings